Hector Matthew Kyprianou (born 27 May 2001) is a professional footballer who plays for Peterborough United as a midfielder. Born in England, he has represented Cyprus at under-19 and under-21 level.

Career

Leyton Orient
A regular in Leyton Orient's U18 side during the 2017–18 season, Kyprianou went on a month's work experience loan to Harlow Town in August 2018, making three appearances.

In October, he signed a similar deal with Bishop's Stortford which continued until March 2019. He made 21 appearances in all competitions.

In March 2019, he signed on loan with National League South side Hampton & Richmond Borough, making one appearance, in the 3–1 league win at Billericay Town.

He was called up to the Cyprus U19 squad in January 2019. He also signed a professional contract with Leyton Orient which began on 1 July 2019. 

On 6 November, Kyprianou made his senior Orient debut in the EFL Trophy group stage match against Brighton U21, which Orient won on penalties after a 1–1 draw. He also started the next match in the competition, the 1–1 draw in the second round at Bristol Rovers on 4 December, which Orient lost on penalties.  He made his league debut on 7 December in the 1–1 draw at Oldham Athletic. 

On 1 April 2021, Kyprianou signed a contract extension at Leyton Orient until 30 June 2023. Kyprianou is represented by New Vision Sports Group.

Peterborough United
On 22 June 2022, Kyprianou signed for League One club Peterborough United for an undisclosed fee on a three-year contract. 
He scored his first football league goal and his first for Peterborough in a 3-0 win against Morecambe

International career
Kyprianou played several times for the Cyprus under-19 team and Cyprus under-21 before being called up to the Cyprus national team in June 2021 when he was an unused substitute for the match against Ukraine.

Career statistics

References

External links

Living people
2001 births
Footballers from Enfield, London
Association football forwards
Cypriot footballers
Cyprus youth international footballers
English footballers
English people of Greek Cypriot descent
Leyton Orient F.C. players
Harlow Town F.C. players
Bishop's Stortford F.C. players
Hampton & Richmond Borough F.C. players
Peterborough United F.C. players
English Football League players
National League (English football) players
Isthmian League players